"Take a Picture" / "Poppin Shakin" is the second single by Japanese girl group NiziU. It was released as a double A-side single on April 7, 2021, by JYP Entertainment and Epic Records Japan.

Background and release
NiziU released their debut single "Step and a Step" in December 2020. In February 2021, the group announced the release of a double A-side single "Take a Picture / Poppin' Shakin'". "Take a Picture" was written and composed by J. Y. Park, Sim Eunjee, Tim Tan, Mayu Wakisaka, and Ciara Muscat, and arranged by Trippy. "Poppin' Shakin'" was written by Safari Natsukawa, and composed by Ollipop, Hayley Aitken, and Woo Min Lee "collapsedone", the latter of whom also arranged the track. "Take a Picture / Poppin' Shakin'" was released as a CD and digital single on April 7, 2021, through JYP Entertainment and Epic Records Japan. The physical version was made available in a regular edition and two limited editions. The limited edition A of the single also comes with a DVD containing the making of the single.

"Take a Picture" was used in an advertisement campaign for Coca-Cola, while "Poppin' Shakin'" was used for promoting the "NiziU Lab" project, the group's endorsement deal with SoftBank Group.

Reception
"Take a Picture" / "Poppin' Shakin'" took the number one spot on the first day of its release on the Oricon Daily Singles Chart, selling 23,277 units. It debuted at number one on the Weekly Singles Chart, recording over 317,000 physical copies. "Take a Picture" peaked at number one on the Japan Hot 100 on April 7, 2021, and remained there for two consecutive weeks. "Poppin' Shakin'" peaked at number seven on April 14.

English version
The English versions of "Take a Picture" and "Poppin' Shakin'" were released as part of U on November 24, 2021.

Track listing

Charts

Weekly charts

Year-end charts

Certifications

Release history

References 

2021 singles
NiziU songs
Japanese-language songs
Oricon Weekly number-one singles
JYP Entertainment singles
Sony Music Entertainment Japan singles